In enzymology, a methylquercetagetin 6-O-methyltransferase is an enzyme that catalyzes the chemical reaction

S-adenosyl-L-methionine + 5,6,3',4'-tetrahydroxy-3,7-dimethoxyflavone  S-adenosyl-L-homocysteine + 5,3',4'-trihydroxy-3,6,7-trimethoxyflavone

Thus, the two substrates of this enzyme are S-adenosyl methionine and 5,6,3',4'-tetrahydroxy-3,7-dimethoxyflavone, whereas its two products are S-adenosylhomocysteine and 5,3',4'-trihydroxy-3,6,7-trimethoxyflavone.

This enzyme belongs to the family of transferases, specifically those transferring one-carbon group methyltransferases.  The systematic name of this enzyme class is S-adenosyl-L-methionine:3',4',5,6-tetrahydroxy-3,7-dimethoxyflavone 6-O-methyltransferase. Other names in common use include flavonol 6-O-methyltransferase, flavonol 6-methyltransferase, 6-OMT, S-adenosyl-L-methionine:3',4',5,6-tetrahydroxy-3,7-dimethoxyflavone, and 6-O-methyltransferase.

References

 
 

EC 2.1.1
Enzymes of unknown structure